Xenia Tomasa Estrada Villalta (born 6 September 1989) is a road cyclist and cross-country mountain biker from El Salvador.

Major results
Source: 

2010
 1st Cross-country, National Mountain Bike Championships 
2012
 National Road Championships
1st Time trial
3rd Road race
2013
 1st Cross-country, National Mountain Bike Championships 
 2nd Time trial, National Road Championships
2014
 National Road Championships
1st Time trial
1st Road race
 1st Cross-country, National Mountain Bike Championships 
2015
 1st Cross-country, National Mountain Bike Championships
 3rd Road race, National Road Championships
2016
 1st Road race, National Road Championships
 1st Cross-country, National Mountain Bike Championships
2017
 National Road Championships
2nd Road race
3rd Time trial
2019
 National Road Championships
1st Time trial
1st Road race
 7th Time trial, Central American Road Championships
2020
 1st Time trial, National Road Championships
2021
 3rd Road race, National Road Championships
2022
 2nd Time trial, National Road Championships

References

External links
 

Salvadoran female cyclists
Living people
Place of birth missing (living people)
1989 births